Sayed El Atefy is an Egyptian film about a simple woman called Um Sayed (Abla Kamel) who raises her son after his father died. She works a taxi driver and car pickups to face life's burdens. At the same time loving Al-Ahli Team so much and sponsor her son Sayed (Tamer Hosny), who is facing several problems at the university with his uncle. Um Sayed and friends try to lift the injustice done to her son in the comic style concert.

Sources

2000s Arabic-language films
2005 films
Egyptian romance films
2000s romance films